Villains is the sixth full-length studio album by Filipino rock band Wolfgang. This was the first album since 2001's Black Mantra and the first album without original drummer Wolf Gemora.

Track listing

Personnel 
Sebastian "Basti" Artadi (vocals)
Manuel Legarda (guitar)
Ramon "Mon" Legaspi (bass)
Francis Aquino (drums)

See also
Pinoy rock
Razorback (band)
Wolfgang (band)

References

External links
Wolfgang Website
Wolfgang's Sixth: "Villains" due on December 2008 - PhilMusic.com article on Wolfgang
Wolfgang's Mailing List

2008 albums
Wolfgang (band) albums